Maurice Webb PC (26 September 1904 – 10 June 1956) was a British Labour Party politician.

Webb joined the Labour Party in 1922 as a teenager, and was a well-known political journalist; including for the Daily Herald.  From 1929 to 1935, he worked as the Labour Party's communications officer. He was also a broadcast commentator and a member of the executive of the National Union of Journalists.

Webb was elected as the Member of Parliament (MP) for Bradford Central in the 1945 general election. He served as the Chairman of the Parliamentary Labour Party from 1946 to 1950. In 1949, he intervened to delay Brian Close's National Service so the eighteen-year-old Close could complete the cricket season playing for Yorkshire County Cricket Club. In 1950, he was appointed as Minister of Food, a key role in a time of rationing, and was appointed as a Privy Counsellor. After his Bradford Central seat was abolished for the 1955 general election, he contested Bradford North but narrowly lost to the sitting Conservative MP.

He died on June 10, 1956, aged 51.

References

External links 
 

1904 births
1956 deaths
Members of the Fabian Society
Members of the Privy Council of the United Kingdom
Labour Party (UK) MPs for English constituencies
UK MPs 1945–1950
UK MPs 1950–1951
UK MPs 1951–1955
Politicians from Bradford
Ministers in the Attlee governments, 1945–1951